Barry Metcalf (born 30 September 1960) is a former Welsh cricketer.  Metcalf was a left-handed batsman.  He was born in Connah's Quay, Flintshire.

Metcalf made his debut for Wales Minor Counties in the 1991 Minor Counties Championship against Cheshire.  He played Minor counties cricket for Wales Minor Counties from 1991 to 1993, which included 7 Minor Counties Championship matches. He made his only List A appearance for Wales Minor Counties against Sussex in the NatWest Trophy. In this match, he scored 30 before being dismissed by Ian Salisbury.

References

External links
Barry Metcalf at ESPNcricinfo
Barry Metcalf at CricketArchive

1960 births
Living people
People from Connah's Quay
Sportspeople from Flintshire
Welsh cricketers
Wales National County cricketers